A lake wind advisory is issued by the United States National Weather Service local forecast offices when windy conditions on area lakes are expected to be hazardous for boaters and other recreational events on or around lakes.

Example
 URGENT - WEATHER MESSAGE
 NATIONAL WEATHER SERVICE SHREVEPORT LA
 1148 AM CST SUN NOV 11 2012
 
 LAZ017-020-022-TXZ166-167-112200-
 /O.EXA.KSHV.LW.Y.0038.000000T0000Z-121111T2200Z/
 SABINE LA-GRANT-LA SALLE-SAN AUGUSTINE-SABINE TX-
 INCLUDING THE CITIES OF...MANY...COLFAX...JENA...SAN AUGUSTINE...
 HEMPHILL
 1148 AM CST SUN NOV 11 2012
 
 ...LAKE WIND ADVISORY IN EFFECT UNTIL 4 PM CST THIS AFTERNOON...
 
 THE NATIONAL WEATHER SERVICE IN SHREVEPORT HAS ISSUED A LAKE WIND
 ADVISORY...WHICH IS IN EFFECT UNTIL 4 PM CST THIS AFTERNOON.
 
 * EVENT...WINDS OF 15 TO 25 MPH WITH GUSTS TO 30 MPH.
 
 * TIMING....
 
 * IMPACT...BOATERS SHOULD USE CAUTION IN OPEN WATERS ON AREA
   LAKES.
  
 PRECAUTIONARY/PREPAREDNESS ACTIONS...
 
 A LAKE WIND ADVISORY INDICATES THAT WINDS WILL CAUSE ROUGH CHOP
 ON AREA LAKES. SMALL BOATS WILL BE ESPECIALLY PRONE TO CAPSIZING.
 
 &&

See also
 Wind advisory

References

National Weather Service